MJJ may refer to:
Michael Jackson (Michael Joseph Jackson), American singer-songwriter
Michael Jordan (Michael Jeffrey Jordan), American professional basketball player
Michael Jepsen Jensen, Danish speedway rider